was a town located in Kamikawa (Teshio) District, Kamikawa Subprefecture, Hokkaido, Japan.

As of 2004, the town had an estimated population of 5,234 and a density of 23.73 persons per km2. The total area was 220.61 km2.

On 27 March 2006, Fūren was merged into the expanded city of Nayoro.  Before its dissolution, the town mascot was "Fumi-kun".

The primary industry in Fūren-chō is wet-rice farming.

External links
 Nayoro official website 

Dissolved municipalities of Hokkaido